Awaab Ishak, a two-year old child living in a one-bedroom flat at the Ilminster block on Rochdale's Freehold estate, died in December 2020 as a result of a severe respiratory condition. In 2022, a coroner at Rochdale coroner's court ruled that this was caused by prolonged exposure to black mould in his home which had "inadequate ventilation and was not equipped for normal day-to-day living activities which led to excess damp and condensation". Awaab's death led to a proposed change in the law, known as "Awaab's Law".

Background
His father had complained to Rochdale Boroughwide Housing about the mould in 2017 and was told to paint over it. His father and mother, who moved to the UK from Sudan in 2016 and 2017 respectively, said they had "no doubt at all" that they were treated poorly "because we are not from the country and are less aware of how the systems in the UK work". In June 2020, his father instructed solicitors and initiated a claim over the problem. In December 2020, a surveyor described the conditions at his home as "unfit for human habitation".

Coroner's report
The coroner's report stated that there was an evident gap in the information-sharing between health visitors/midwives/early help services and the GP. Health visitors had raised concerns in July 2020 and the community midwife completed a special circumstances form in September to children's services highlighting the issue. Dr Caroline Taylor, chair of the National Association of Primary Care said "We all write letters to the housing association and we tell our patients we don't feel like it will make any difference." Middleton Primary Care Network – neighbouring the estate – is proposing that social prescribers will be sent to assess patients' housing conditions to strengthen a GP's case to local agencies.

Responses
Following the coroner's verdict, the company's chief executive Gareth Swarbrick said that he was "truly devastated about Awaab's death and the things we got wrong. We didn't recognise the level of risk to a little boy's health from the mould in the family's home. We allowed a legal disrepair process, widely used in the housing sector, to get in the way of promptly tackling the mould". On 19 November 2022, Swarbrick was dismissed as chief executive of the housing association by its board.

The Housing Ombudsman, Richard Blakeway, is exercising his powers to carry out a further investigation to see if this complaint is indicative of wider failure from the landlord.

Legislative changes 
In February 2023, the Government announced it would implement "Awaab's Law", which will require social housing providers to remedy reported damp and mould within certain time limits. The Housing Secretary Michael Gove made the announcement as he met with Awaab's family in Rochdale. The new law is proposed to be part of the Social Housing (Regulation) Bill currently going through Parliament.

See also
 Indoor mould
 Mould health issues

References 

2020 deaths
Child deaths
December 2020 events in the United Kingdom